Pivio (born 7 June 1958 in Genoa, Italy) and Aldo De Scalzi (born 23 January 1957 in Genoa, Italy) are two Italian composers, best known for scoring music for television and motion pictures.
They are not siblings: Pivio is a pseudonym for Roberto Pischiutta, while Aldo De Scalzi is Vittorio De Scalzi's brother, founding member of New Trolls, an Italian progressive rock band. Aldo himself has written and composed many songs for New Trolls, including "Faccia di Cane", in competition at the popular Italian song contest Sanremo Music Festival in 1985. 
Moreover, in 1973 Aldo and Vittorio De Scalzi started together their own music studio, Studio G. and the record labels Magma and Grog Records, renowned for having hosted, during the 70s, the most talented bands from progressive rock Italian movement (New Trolls, Picchio dal Pozzo, Alphataurus, Pholas Dactilus, Latte e miele, Mandillo, Celeste, Sigillo di Horus). From 1976 on, Aldo starts playing with the progressive rock band Picchio dal Pozzo.

Meanwhile, in 1979 Pivio founded along with Marco Odino, the new wave band Scortilla, famous for the hit "Fahrenheit 451", in competition at the Italian music contest Festivalbar, in 1984 edition. Graduated with a degree in Electronic Engineering at Genova University, Pivio moved in Rome in the late 1980s. Pivio and Aldo De Scalzi started their collaboration during the 90s and throughout their career, have been in soundtrack work for various motion pictures, starting with Hamam (Il bagno Turco) directed by Ferzan Özpetek in 1997.

Moreover, in 1995 Pivio and Aldo De Scalzi started the side project Trancendental, developing their interest in Mediterranean world music, crossing Maghreb and Middle East musical traditions and in 2004 started the record label I dischi dell'espleta and the publishing company Creuza S.r.l.

The duo 

Pivio and Aldo De Scalzi met during the 1980s when Aldo happened to be the sound technician for a Scortilla's tour. Then, Aldo (with Danilo Madonia, who made many arrangements for, among the others, Renato Zero), produced "Fahrenheit 451", the Scortilla's album, released by Warner. The duo Pivio and Aldo De Scalzi were born officially in 1991. with their debut album Maccaia followed, in 1995, by Mirag in which they explore middle eastern sounds, which were developed more clearly in Deposizione (released in 1995, with the nickname of "Trancendental"); in this album there are echoes of the duo's musical bias: progressive rock and new wave.

Film work 

When film producer and director Marco Risi and his wife and actress Francesca D'Aloja listened to the album Deposizione, the couple decided to contact Pivio and Aldo De Scalzi to get them involved with a film project: Hamam, the directorial debut by Turkish-Italian filmmaker Ferzan Özpetek, produced by Marco Risi and starring Francesca D'Aloja and Alessandro Gassman. The duo composed in twelve days the original motion picture soundtrack, inspired by Turkish musical tradition and melting ancient with more contemporary sounds. In 1997 Hamam was screened in the Quinzaine des Réalisateurs section at 50º Cannes Film Festival, where gained audience and film critics attention. Released in Italy by Italian film distribution company Filmauro, Hamam stayed in theaters for almost three months and the original soundtrack sold more than 300,000 copies. For Pivio and Aldo De Scalzi it was the very beginning of a long career as composers for motion pictures. Among the others, they scored for Outlaw, I giardini dell'Eden, Harem Suare, Casomai, El Alamein – The Line of Fire, Piano 17, Barbarossa, Complici del silenzio, Si può fare, La peggiore settimana della mia vita, The Butterfly Room, Razzabastarda and for TV series Distretto di Polizia, L'ispettore Coliandro and Medicina generale. The duo has had a long association with directors Manetti Bros., composing the music for, among the others, L'ispettore Coliandro, The Arrival of Wang, Paura 3D, Song 'e Napule and the awarded musical Ammore e malavita.

Filmography

Pivio solo filmography

Film TV and TV-series

Theatre

Awards and nominations

David di Donatello 

|-
| 2000
| Outlaw
| Best Original Score
| 
|-
| 2003
| Casomai
| Best Original Score
| 
|-
| 2009
| Si può fare
| Best Original Score
| 
|-
| 2013
| Razzabastarda
| Best Song
| 
|-
|-
| 2014
| Song'e Napule
| Best Original Score
| 
|-
|-
| 2018
| Ammore e malavita
| Best Original Song
| 
|-
|-
| 2018
| Ammore e malavita
| Best Original Score
| 
|-
|-
| 2021
| Non odiare
| Best Original Song
| 
|-
|-
| 2021
| Non odiare
| Best Composer
| 
|-
|-
| 2022
| Diabolik
| Best Composer
| 
|-

Nastri d'Argento 

|-
| 1997
| Hamam
| Best Original Score
| 
|-
| 1999
| Elvjs & Merilijn
| Best Original Score
| 
|-
| 2002
| Casomai
| Best Original Score
| 
|-
| 2007
| Piano 17
| Best Original Score
| 
|-
| 2007
| Maradona, the Hand of God
| Best Original Score
| 
|-
| 2009
| Si può fare
| Best Original Score
| 
|-
| 2009
| Complici del silenzio
| Best Original Score
| 
|-
| 2013
| 
| Best Original Score
| 
|-
| 2014
| Song'e Napule
| Best Original Score
| 
|-
| 2015
| Le frise ignoranti
| Best Original Song
| 
|-
| 2018
| Ammore e malavita
| Best Original Score
| 
|-
| 2018
| Ammore e malavita
| Best Original Song
| 
|-
| 2021
| Non Odiare
| Best Original Score
| 
|-
| 2022
| Diabolik
| Best Original Score
| 
|-
| 2022
| Il silenzio grande
| Best Original Score
| 
|-

Bif&st - Bari International Film Festival 

|-
| 2014
| Song'e Napule
| Ennio Morricone Award - Best Original Score
| 
|-
| 2018
| Ammore e malavita
| Ennio Morricone Award - Best Original Score
| 
|-

Ciak d'oro 

|-
| 2000
| Harem Suare
| Best Original Score
| 
|-
| 2006
| Piano 17
| Best Original Score
| 
|-
| 2013
| Razzabastarda
| Ciak d'oro for Best Original Score and Best Song
| 
|-
| 2018
| Ammore e malavita
| Best Song
| 
|-
| 2018
| Ammore e malavita
| Best Original Score
| 
|-
| 2021
| Il silenzio grande
| Best Original Score
| 
|-
| 2021
| Non odiare
| Best Song
| 
|-

Globo d'oro 

|-
| 1997
| Hamam
| Best Original Score
| 
|-
| 1998
| Elvjs & Merilijn
| Best Original Score
| 
|-
| 2009
| Si può fare
| Best Original Score
| 
|-
| 2013
| Razzabastarda
| Best Original Score
| 
|- 
| 2014
| Song 'e Napule
| Best Original Score
| 
|-
| 2018
| Ammore e malavita
| Best Original Score
| 
|-

Premio Roma VideoClip 

|-
| 2011
| The Arrival of Wang
| Best Original Score
| 
|-
| 2013
| Razzabastarda
| Best Original Score
| 
|-

Soundtrack Stars Award 

|-
| 2017
| Ammore e malavita
| Best Italian Score
| 
|-

Premio FICE 

|-
| 2009
| Complici del silenzio
| Best Original Score
| 
|-
| 2009
| Si può fare
| Best Original Score
| 
|-

Ciliegia d'Oro 

|-
| 2009
| Si può fare
| Best Original Score
| 
|-
| 2018
| Ammore e malavita
| Best Original Score
| 
|-

|-
| 
| 7 Km da Gerusalemme
| Best Original Score
| 
|-

Premio Fellini 

|-
| 2002
| El Alamein - The Line of Fire
| Best Original Score
| 
|-

Premio Musica de Andalusia 

|-
| 2000
| Hamam
| Best Original Score
| 
|-

Antalya Golden Orange Film Festival 

|-
| 1997
| Hamam
| Best Original Score
| 
|-

References

External links 

 
 Facebook - Pivio and Aldo De Scalzi
 
 

Italian musical duos